The Minister of Agriculture of Hungary is a member of the Hungarian cabinet and the head of the Ministry of Agriculture. The current agriculture minister is István Nagy.

The position was called Minister of Agriculture, Industry and Trade from 1848 to 1889, People's Commissar of Agriculture during the Hungarian Soviet Republic in 1919, Minister of Agriculture and Food between 1967 and 1990, Minister of Agriculture and Rural Development from 1998 till 2010 and Minister of Rural Development between 2010 and 2014.

This page is a list of Ministers of Agriculture of Hungary.

Ministers of Agriculture, Industry and Trade (1848–1889)

Hungarian Kingdom (1848–1849)
Parties

Hungarian State (1849)
Parties

After the collapse of the Hungarian Revolution of 1848, the Hungarian Kingdom became an integral part of the Austrian Empire until 1867, when dual Austro-Hungarian Monarchy was created.

Hungarian Kingdom (1867–1889)
Parties

Ministers of Agriculture (1889–1919)

Hungarian Kingdom (1889–1918)
Parties

Hungarian People's Republic (1918–1919)
Parties

People's Commissars of Justice (1919)

Hungarian Soviet Republic (1919)
Parties

Counter-revolutionary governments (1919)
Parties

Ministers of Agriculture (1919–1967)

Hungarian People's Republic (1919)
Parties

Hungarian Republic (1919–1920)
Parties

Hungarian Kingdom (1920–1946)
Parties

Government of National Unity (1944–1945)
Parties

Soviet-backed provisional governments (1944–1946)
Parties

Hungarian Republic (1946–1949)
Parties

Hungarian People's Republic (1949–1967)
Parties

Ministers of Agriculture and Food (1967–1990)

Hungarian People's Republic (1967–1989)
Parties

Hungarian Republic (1989–1990)
Parties

Ministers of Agriculture (1990–1998)

Hungarian Republic (1990–2006)
Parties

Ministers of Agriculture and Rural Development (1998–2010)

Hungarian Republic (1998–2010)
Parties

Ministers of Rural Development (2010–2014)

Hungarian Republic / Hungary (2010–2014)
Parties

Ministers of Agriculture (2014–present)

Hungary (2014–present)
Parties

See also
List of heads of state of Hungary
List of prime ministers of Hungary
List of Ministers of Civilian Intelligence Services of Hungary
List of Ministers of Croatian Affairs of Hungary
List of Ministers of Defence of Hungary
List of Ministers of Education of Hungary
List of Ministers of Finance of Hungary
List of Ministers of Foreign Affairs of Hungary
List of Ministers of Interior of Hungary
List of Ministers of Justice of Hungary
List of Ministers of Public Works and Transport of Hungary
Politics of Hungary

Agriculture Ministers